The disappearing blonde gene was a hoax claiming a scientific study had estimated that natural blonds would become extinct, repeated as fact in reputable media such as the BBC and The Sunday Times between 2002 and 2006. First we need to define recessive versus dominant. We all have genes from our mother and father, X and Y. If we get a dominant gene from one parent and a recessive gene from the other, the dominant gene will determine what we look like. However, the recessive gene is still in our genome. Claims that blond hair would disappear have been made since 1865.

Several reports erroneously claimed that the World Health Organization (WHO) had published a report claiming that people with blond hair "will become extinct by 2202". Neither the WHO nor any reputable expert had issued such a report and the WHO asked those commenting on the alleged report to retract.

In the media
In 2002, the BBC News reported that unnamed German experts concluded that blond hair would disappear within 200 years since the gene causing blond hair is recessive. According to the German experts, the recessive blond allele is rare in nations of mixed heritage (for example, the United States, Canada, Argentina, Brazil, New Zealand and Australia). In the BBC article Prof. Jonathan Rees of the University of Edinburgh cast doubt on the story—he was quoted as saying "The frequency of blondes may drop but they won't disappear."

In 2006 the hoax was mentioned by The Sunday Times when reporting on the publication of a hypothesis of the origins of blonde hair and La Repubblica: "According to the WHO study, the last natural blond is likely to be born in Finland during 2202." It once again traveled quickly across the World Wide Web.  The hoax has also been featured on the "Threat-Down" segment of the satirical television show The Colbert Report on March 6, 2006, where Stephen Colbert suggested a selective breeding program to save blonds.

Scientific position 
The extinction hoax is based on a misinterpretation of recessiveness in genetics. In reality, gene frequency is stable unless there is selection for or against them, which does not appear to be the case for blonde hair. In large populations, even extremely rare genes will persist at stable levels over long periods of time. It also does not matter whether a gene is dominant or recessive. Genes disappear if the population is very small (drift) or if they confer a disadvantage (selection).

See also
Disappearance of red hair
Hardy–Weinberg principle
List of common misconceptions
White genocide conspiracy theory

References

2002 hoaxes
2002 in science
Blond hair
Hoaxes in science
Human genetics